Stefan Jarl (born 18 March 1941) is a Swedish film director best known for his documentaries. Together with Jan Lindqvist he made the Mods Trilogy, three films which follow a group of alienated people in Stockholm from the 1960s to the 1990s, They Call Us Misfits (1968), A Respectable Life (1979) and The Social Heritage (1993). A Respectable Life won the 1979 Guldbagge Awards for Best Film and Best Director. Jarl also wrote and directed Jag är din krigare (1997), and directed Terrorists: The Kids They Sentenced (2003), The Girl From Auschwitz (2005), and Submission (2010), a documentary about the "chemical burden" of synthetics and plastics carried by people born after World War II.

At the 25th Guldbagge Awards in 1990 he won the Creative Achievement award and in 2017 Jarl received the Lenin Award.

Selected filmography
 They Call Us Misfits (Dom kallar oss mods) codirector Jan Lindqvist
 A Respectable Life (Ett anständigt liv, 1979)
 Det sociala arvet (1993)
 Jag är din krigare (1997)
 Terrorists: The Kids They Sentenced (Terrorister - en film om dom dömda, 2003)
 Submission (Underkastelsen, 2010)

References

External links

Stefan Jarl's homepage 

Swedish film directors
German-language film directors
1941 births
Living people
Best Director Guldbagge Award winners
Producers who won the Best Film Guldbagge Award